Flaurling is a municipality in the district Innsbruck country in Tyrol (Austria). It lies in the Inn valley between Innsbruck and Telfs south of the Inn River.

The municipality consists of the areas: Flaurling village, Flaurling station with a commercial district and Flaurlingberg at the western foothills of a low mountain range terrace. It was mentioned documentarily for the first time as "Flurininga" in the year 763.

Population

Twin towns
  Andocs, Hungary

References

External links
 Town History (German)

Cities and towns in Innsbruck-Land District